Gilbert Yegon (born 26 January 1988) is a Kenyan long-distance runner who competes in marathon races.

He began taking part in road races in 2008, and he ran a time of 1:02:43 at the Nairobi Half Marathon for third place. He entered the Berlin Half Marathon the following year and improved his time to 1:01:26, finishing in twelfth place. In September 2009, he ran at the Rotterdam Half Marathon but was three minutes behind the winner Sammy Kitwara, having run 1:02:00 for fourteenth place. He stepped up to make his marathon debut at the 2009 Amsterdam Marathon and scored his first major victory. In one of the fastest ever debuts, he ran a time of 2:06:18 to break Haile Gebrselassie's four-year-old course record.

He ran at the 20 van Alphen in March 2010 and finished in third place, behind Bernard Chepkok and Dejene Yirdaw, but recorded a 20 km best time of 58:56. He came 22nd at the 2010 Boston Marathon and fared better at the 2010 Berlin Marathon, taking eighth place in 2:10:34 hours. He did not compete in 2011 but returned to competition at the 2012 Vienna Marathon with a runner-up performance in 2:07:38 hours.

Achievements
All results regarding marathon, unless stated otherwise

Personal bests 

All information taken from IAAF profile.

Competition record
2008 Nairobi Half Marathon – 3rd

References

External links

marathoninfo



1988 births
Living people
Kenyan male long-distance runners
Kenyan male marathon runners